Waldvogel (from  "forest" plus Vogel "bird", thus literally "bird of the forest") and its Ashkenazic variant Waldfogel is a Swiss German surname from a nickname denoting a carefree, easy-going person and may refer to:

Waldfogel 
Jane Waldfogel, American social economist
Joel Waldfogel (born 1962), American economist

Waldvogel 
Anton Waldvogel (1846–1917), Austrian technician and traffic planner
Christian Waldvogel (born 1971), Swiss architect
Georg Waldvogel (born 1961), German ski jumper
József Waldvogel (1872–1952), Austro-Hungarian general
Monica Waldvogel (born 1956), Brazilian journalist
Procopius Waldvogel (15th-century), German printer

References 

German-language surnames
Jewish surnames
Yiddish-language surnames
Surnames from nicknames